Scott County is a county located in the U.S. state of Illinois. According to the 2010 census, it had a population of 5,355, making it the fourth-least populous county in Illinois. Its county seat is Winchester.

Scott County is part of the Jacksonville, IL Micropolitan Statistical Area, which is also included in the Springfield-Jacksonville-Lincoln, IL Combined Statistical Area.

History
Scott County was formed in 1839 out of Morgan County. It was named for Scott County, Kentucky.

Geography
The county's western boundary is formed by the Illinois River.

Climate and weather

Major highways
  Interstate 72
  U.S. Route 36
  U.S. Route 67
  Illinois Route 106
  Illinois Route 100

Adjacent counties
 Morgan County (east)
 Greene County (south)
 Pike County (west)

Demographics

As of the 2010 census, there were 5,355 people, 2,214 households, and 1,516 families living in the county. The racial makeup of the county was 98.6% white, 0.2% Asian, 0.2% American Indian, 0.2% black or African American, 0.1% from other races, and 0.7% from two or more races. Those of Hispanic or Latino origin made up 0.8% of the population. In terms of ancestry, 26.3% were German, 24.3% were American, 18.0% were English, and 16.2% were Irish.

Of the 2,214 households, 32.0% had children under the age of 18 living with them, 54.7% were married couples living together, 9.1% had a female householder with no husband present, 31.5% were non-families, and 27.3% of all households were made up of individuals. The average household size was 2.40 and the average family size was 2.89. The median age was 42.7 years.

The median income for a household in the county was $49,462 and the median income for a family was $64,412. Males had a median income of $40,781 versus $32,011 for females. The per capita income for the county was $27,530. About 6.5% of families and 9.1% of the population were below the poverty line, including 9.5% of those under age 18 and 10.2% of those age 65 or over.

Communities

City
 Winchester

Town
 Naples

Villages
 Alsey
 Bluffs
 Exeter
 Glasgow
 Manchester

Unincorporated communities
 Bloomfield
 Merritt
 Oxville
 Riggston

Population ranking
The population ranking of the following table is based on the 2020 census of Scott County.

† county seat

Politics

See also
 National Register of Historic Places listings in Scott County

References

External links
 

 
1839 establishments in Illinois
Populated places established in 1839
Illinois counties
Jacksonville, Illinois micropolitan area